Bensonhurst Maternity Hospital was built in the mid 1920s "across Bay Parkway from JCH" (Jewish Community House of Bensonhurst). It had its share of families with fathers
who "paced ... and nervously smoked one cigarette after another" and families with sad news.

As of 2016, the building houses a Jewish School.

References

Defunct hospitals in Brooklyn
Bensonhurst, Brooklyn
Maternity hospitals in the United States
Women in New York City
History of women in New York (state)